Ider River (Mongolian: Идэр гол, lit. "youthful river") is a river in the Khövsgöl and Zavkhan aimags in northwestern Mongolia and is, together with the Delgermörön river, one of the sources of the Selenge river. The source is in the Khangai range, the confluence with the Delgermörön is in Tömörbulag. The river is frozen 170–180 nights per year. There is a wooden bridge, which was built in 1940, near Jargalant and a concrete bridge in Galt.

See also 
List of rivers of Mongolia

References

Rivers of Mongolia
Khövsgöl Province